Cesko-narodni sin-Milligan Auditorium, also known as Milligan Auditorium, is a historic building in Milligan, Nebraska, USA, that was built in 1929. It was listed on the National Register of Historic Places on February 29, 1996. The building is a meeting hall for the Czech community. It historically hosted dances, Sokol events, films and Czech theater.

See also
 Zapadni Cesko-Bratrska Jednota
 Czech-Slovak Protective Society

References

External links
 Milligan Auditorium remains a community center

Czech-American culture in Nebraska
Clubhouses on the National Register of Historic Places in Nebraska
Buildings and structures in Fillmore County, Nebraska
Sokol in the United States
Buildings and structures completed in 1929
National Register of Historic Places in Fillmore County, Nebraska